Saliba Island is a large island in Milne Bay Province, Papua New Guinea.

Administration 
The island has 2 Wards : Sidudu in the northern part (with adjoining islands), and Sauasauaga on the southern part (which also includes adjoining islands and the western part of Sideia). 
Both Wards belong to Bwanabwana Rural Local Level Government Area LLG, Samarai-Murua District, which are in Milne Bay Province.

Geography 
The island is part of the Sariba group, itself a part of Samarai Islands of the Louisiade Archipelago.
The island is only 240 meters at its most closest part to the larger Sideia Island, near the town of Sauasauaga.

History 
Sariba Island was first sighted by Europeans when the Spanish expedition of Luís Vaez de Torres passed through Sawa Sawaga channel that they named Boca de Batalla (Battle Passage) on 20 July 1606. During World War II the US Navy built a seaplane base on the island as part of Naval Base Milne Bay.

Demographics 
The population of 1880 is living in 30 villages across the island. The most important one, and where the dock is located, is Sidudu. The other villages (clockwise): Simsimai, Nawaripa, Tobai, Wakoiara, Tanabuibuna, Sebuluna, Bwasikoko, Lamabo, Labulabu, Namoai, Isunaleilei, Sauasauaga, Dabunai, Bwastau, Porapa, Gamarai, Kwalosai, Iogi, Sunamaleuya, Kikina, Debasina, Koitubitubi, Magalkalona, Magesina, Magehau, Dagadaga.

Economy 
The islanders, are farmers as opposed to eastern Louisiade Archipelago islanders. they grow Sago, Taro, and Yams for crops.

Transportation 
There is a dock at Sidudu.

References

Islands of Milne Bay Province
Louisiade Archipelago